Bembecia is a genus of moths in the family Sesiidae.

Species

Bembecia abromeiti  Kallies & Riefenstahl, 2000
Bembecia afghana Bartsch & Špatenka, 2010
Bembecia alaica (Püngeler, 1912)
Bembecia albanensis (Rebel, 1918)
Bembecia albanensis albanensis (Rebel, 1918)
Bembecia albanensis garganica Bertaccini & Fiumi, 2002
Bembecia albanensis kalavrytana (Sheljuzhko, 1924)
Bembecia albanensis tunetana (Le Cerf, 1920)
Bembecia aloisi  Špatenka, 1997
Bembecia apyra (Le Cerf, 1937)
Bembecia apyra apyra (Le Cerf, 1937)
Bembecia apyra johannesi Gorbunov, 1995
Bembecia auricaudata (Bartel, 1912)
Bembecia aye Stalling, Altermatt, Lingenhöle & Garrevoet, 2010
Bembecia balkis (Le Cerf, 1937)
Bembecia balkis atrocaudata Wiltshire, 1986
Bembecia balkis balkis (Le Cerf, 1937)
Bembecia barbara (Bartel, 1912)
Bembecia bartschi Garrevoet & Lingenhöle, 2011
Bembecia bestianaeli (Capuse, 1973)
Bembecia blanka  Špatenka, 2001
Bembecia bohatschi (Püngeler, [1905])
Bembecia buxea  Gorbunov, 1989
Bembecia ceiformis (Staudinger, 1881)
Bembecia coreacola (Matsumura, 1931)
Bembecia damascena Spatenka & Pavlicko 2011
Bembecia deserticola  Špatenka, Petersen & Kallies, 1997
Bembecia dispar (Staudinger, 1891)
Bembecia elena  Spatenka & Bartsch, 2010
Bembecia fibigeri  Laštuvka & Laštuvka, 1994
Bembecia flavida (Oberthür, 1890)
Bembecia fokidensis  Toševski, 1991
Bembecia fortis  Diakonoff, [1968]
Bembecia garrevoeti Lingenhöle & Bartsch, 2011
Bembecia gegamica  Gorbunov, 1991
Bembecia gobica  Špatenka & Lingenhöle, 2002
Bembecia guesnoni Špatenka & Toševski, 1994
Bembecia handiensis  Rämisch, 1997
Bembecia hedysari  Wang & Yang, 1994
Bembecia himmighoffeni (Staudinger, 1866:51)
Bembecia hissorensis Stalling, Bartsch, Garrevoet, Lingenhöle & Altermatt, 2011
Bembecia hofmanni  Kallies & Špatenka, 2003
Bembecia hymenopteriformis (Bellier, 1860)
Bembecia iberica  Špatenka, 1992
Bembecia ichneumoniformis ([Denis & Schiffermüller], 1775)
Bembecia igueri  Bettag & Bläsius, 1998
Bembecia illustris (Rebel, 1901)
Bembecia insidiosa (Le Cerf, 1911)
Bembecia irina  Špatenka, Petersen & Kallies, 1997
Bembecia jakuta (Herz, 1903)
Bembecia joesti  Bettag, 1997
Bembecia kaabaki  Gorbunov, 2001
Bembecia karategina  Špatenka, 1997
Bembecia kaszabi (Capuse, 1973)
Bembecia kreuzbergi  Spatenka & Bartsch, 2010
Bembecia kryzhanovskii  Gorbunov, 2001
Bembecia lamai  Kallies, 1996
Bembecia lasicera (Hampson, 1906)
Bembecia lastuvkai  Spatenka & Bartsch, 2010
Bembecia lingenhoelei Garrevoet & Garrevoet, 2011
Bembecia lomatiaeformis (Lederer, 1853)
Bembecia martensi  Gorbunov, 1994
Bembecia megillaeformis (Hübner, [1808-1813])
Bembecia megillaeformis luqueti Špatenka, 1992
Bembecia megillaeformis megillaeformis (Hübner, [1808-1813])
Bembecia molleti  Kallies & Špatenka, 2003
Bembecia montis (Leech, 1889a)
Bembecia ningxiaensis  Xu & Liu, 1998
Bembecia nivalis  Špatenka, 2001
Bembecia oxytropidis  Špatenka & Lingenhöle, 2002
Bembecia pagesi  Toševski, 1993
Bembecia pamira  Špatenka, 1992
Bembecia parthica (Lederer, 1870)
Bembecia pashtuna  Špatenka, 1997a
Bembecia pavicevici  Toševski, 1989
Bembecia pavicevici dobrovskyi Špatenka, 1997
Bembecia pavicevici pavicevici Toševski, 1989
Bembecia peterseni  Špatenka, 1997
Bembecia pogranzona  Špatenka, Petersen & Kallies, 1997
Bembecia polyzona (Püngeler, 1912)
Bembecia powelli (Le Cerf, 1925)
Bembecia priesneri  Kallies, Petersen & Riefenstahl, 1998
Bembecia psoraleae  Bartsch & Bettag, 1997
Bembecia puella  Laštuvka, 1989
Bembecia pyronigra  Špatenka & Kallies, 2001
Bembecia rushana  Gorbunov, 1992
Bembecia salangica  Špatenka & Reshöft
Bembecia sanguinolenta (Lederer, 1853)
Bembecia sanguinolenta sanguinolenta (Lederer, 1853)
Bembecia sanguinolenta transcaucasica (Staudinger, 1891)
Bembecia sareptana (Bartel, 1912:395)
Bembecia scopigera (Scopoli, 1763)
Bembecia senilis (Grum-Grshimailo, 1890)
Bembecia sinensis (Hampson, 1919)
Bembecia sirphiformis (Lucas, 1849)
Bembecia sophoracola  Xu & Jin, 1999
Bembecia staryi  Špatenka & Gorbunov, 1992
Bembecia stiziformis (Herrich-Schäffer, 1851)
Bembecia stiziformis belouchistanica Špatenka, 2001
Bembecia stiziformis fervida (Lederer, 1855)
Bembecia stiziformis stiziformis (Herrich-Schäffer, 1851)
Bembecia stiziformis tenebrosa (Püngeler, 1914)
Bembecia strandi (Kozhantshikov, 1936)
Bembecia stuebingeri  Sobczyk, Kallies & Riefenstahl, 2007
Bembecia syzcjovi  Gorbunov, 1990
Bembecia syzcjovi alborzica Kallies & Špatenka, 2003
Bembecia syzcjovi kappadocica Špatenka, 1997
Bembecia syzcjovi syzcjovi Gorbunov, 1990
Bembecia tancrei (Püngeler, [1905])
Bembecia tshatkalensis  Spatenka & Kallies, 2006
Bembecia tshimgana (Sheljuzhko, 1935)
Bembecia turanica (Erschoff, 1874)
Bembecia uroceriformis (Treitschke, 1834)
Bembecia uroceriformis armoricana (Oberthür, [1907])
Bembecia uroceriformis uroceriformis (Treitschke, 1834)
Bembecia ussuriensis (Gorbunov & Arita, 1995)
Bembecia vidua (Staudinger, 1889)
Bembecia viguraea (Püngeler, 1912)
Bembecia volgensis  Gorbunov, 1994c
Bembecia vulcanica (Pinker, 1969)
Bembecia zebo  Špatenka & Gorbunov, 1992
Bembecia zonsteini  Gorbunov, 1994

References

External links

Sesiidae
Taxa named by Jacob Hübner